Jason Clarke (born 1969) is an Australian actor. 

Jason Clarke may also refer to:
 Jason Clarke (writer) (born 1978), American writer and web developer

See also
 Jason Clark (disambiguation)
 Jay Clark (disambiguation)